Urbach is a municipality in the district of Rems-Murr in Baden-Württemberg, Germany. It is east of Stuttgart. It belongs to the metropolitan region of Stuttgart.

History

Middle Ages
On 25 May 1181 Frederick I, Holy Roman Emperor "Barbarossa" issued a certificate in which he took the monastery at Adelberg under his protection. In the document, Urbach was referred to as Uracbach.

Modern Times
Since their formation in 1819, the agricultural Oberurbach and the more industrial Unterurbach were two separate municipalities. Ober-and Unterurbach belonged initially to Oberamt Schorndorf and became part of the district of Waiblingen in 1938. In 1970 Ober- and Unterurbach were merged to form the district of Urbach. When Waiblingen was dissolved in 1973, Urbach became part of Rems-Murr-Kreis.

Culture

Buildings
 The Afrakirche is a Protestant church with parts built over the course of the 16th to 18th centuries.
 The Baptist Church was completed in 1999. In 2003 it was awarded with the "Freikirchlicher Architekturpreis".
 Urbach Tower is a 14-metre experimental structure that serves as a lookout point and shelter.

Museums
In Urbach there are two museums, the Museum am Widumhof and the Museum Farrenstall.

Twin Towns 
Urbach is twinned with:
  Szentlőrinc,  Hungary

Sons and daughters of the town
Theodor Bäuerle (born 16 June 1882 in Unterurbach; died 29 May 1956 in Stuttgart), politician (independent, Minister of Culture of Württemberg-Baden)
Eleonore Dehnerdt (born 1956), writer
Hermann Nuding (born 3 July 1902 in Oberurbach; died 31 December 1966 in Stuttgart), KPD -politician, (Bundestag, Landtag Württemberg-Baden)

References

Rems-Murr-Kreis